Nocardioides rotundus is a Gram-positive and aerobic bacterium in the genus Nocardioides which has been isolated from deep seawater from the western Pacific.

References

External links
Type strain of Nocardioides rotundus at BacDive -  the Bacterial Diversity Metadatabase

 

rotundus
Bacteria described in 2016